49th Parallel Coffee Roasters is a Canadian specialty coffee roaster company based in Burnaby, British Columbia. It was founded by brothers Vince and Michael Piccolo in 2004. In January 2019, the company announced a strategic partnership with Montreal-based investment firm Claridge Inc. CBC recognized 49th Parallel Coffee Roasters as a notable specialty coffee roaster in British Columbia. The company sources beans directly from farmers including Honduras, Guatemala, Colombia, Kenya, Costa Rica, Brazil, Ethiopia and more.

References 

Specialty coffees
Food and drink companies established in 2004
Coffee companies
Companies based in Burnaby
2004 establishments in British Columbia
Coffee in North America
Agriculture companies of Canada